Nemanja Jakšić  (Serbian Cyrillic: Немања Јакшић; born 11 July 1995) is a Serbian football defender who plays for Bravo.

Club career

Red Star Belgrade
Jakšić made his professional debut for Red Star Belgrade on 26 May 2013, in Serbian SuperLiga match versus Vojvodina.

References

External links
 
 Nemanja Jakšić at NZS 

Living people
1995 births
Sportspeople from Pristina
Association football fullbacks
Serbian footballers
Red Star Belgrade footballers
FK Železnik players
FK Zeta players
NK Zavrč players
NK Aluminij players
NK Bravo players
Serbian SuperLiga players
Montenegrin First League players
Slovenian PrvaLiga players
Serbian expatriate footballers
Serbian expatriate sportspeople in Montenegro
Serbian expatriate sportspeople in Slovenia
Expatriate footballers in Montenegro
Expatriate footballers in Slovenia
Serbia youth international footballers